Spyros Nousias (born 5 January 1973) is a retired Greek football midfielder.

References

1973 births
Living people
Greek footballers
Naoussa F.C. players
Paniliakos F.C. players
Aris Thessaloniki F.C. players
Super League Greece players
Association football midfielders
Footballers from Kozani